This is a list of episodes from the animated television series Ned's Newt, that ran from 1997 to 1999 on Teletoon.

Series overview

Episodes
The following episodes are listed in order of original broadcast date. Each episode contains two 11-minute shorts.

Seasons 1 and 2 are produced with cel animation, while season 3 features digital ink-and-paint animation.

Season 1 (1997)

Season 2 (1998–99)

Season 3 (1999)

External links
 

 Lists of Canadian children's animated television series episodes